Flimsies are a type of bingo cards printed on thin sheets of paper. They are typically printed with three cards on a single sheet, but also come in other formats:
 One card per sheet
 Two cards per sheet
 Four cards per sheet
 Six cards per sheet
 Nine cards per sheet

Flimsies costs $1–$2 per sheet and a win on a flimsy on a "special" game usually pays quite a bit more than a win on a "regular" game.

They are also known as flimsy sheets or throwaways.

Sources
 Bingo Dictionary

See also
Bingo (U.S.)
Housie
Bingo card

Bingo